Domeniko is a village and a community of the Elassona municipality. Before the 2011 local government reform it was a part of the municipality of Potamia, of which it was a municipal district. The 2011 census recorded 627 inhabitants in the village. The community of Domeniko covers an area of 26.911 km2.

History
The ancient city of Cyretiae can still be traced on the hill where a church dedicated to Saint George now stands. It was a very important one and 2 representatives voted in the Delphic Amphictyony. In the Roman times the name of the city was changed to "Domeniko". Archaeological finds from the site are presented in the Diachronic Museum of Larissa.

Domeniko was mentioned in the 11th century by Anna Komnene. Domeniko was the seat of an Orthodox bishop during the Byzantine period. During the Axis occupation of Greece almost 150 residents of the village were executed by the Italian army.

Economy
The population of Domeniko is occupied in animal husbandry and agriculture (mainly tobacco, grain and almonds).

Population
According to the 2011 census, the population of the settlement of Domeniko was 627 people, an increase of almost 7% compared with the population of the previous census of 2001.

See also
 List of settlements in the Larissa regional unit

References

Populated places in Larissa (regional unit)